Dry quicksand is loose sand whose bulk density is reduced by blowing air through it and which yields easily to weight or pressure. It acts similarly to normal quicksand, but it does not contain any water and does not operate on the same principle. Dry quicksand is an example of a granular material.

Historically, the existence of dry quicksand was doubted, and the reports of humans and complete caravans being lost in dry quicksand were considered to be folklore. In 2004, it was created in the laboratory, but it is still not clear what its actual prevalence in nature is.

Scientific research
Writing in Nature, physicist Detlef Lohse and coworkers of University of Twente in Enschede, Netherlands allowed air to flow through very fine sand (typical grain diameter was about 40 micrometers) in a container with a perforated base. They then turned the air stream off before the start of the experiment and allowed the sand to settle: the packing fraction of this sand was only 41% (compared to 55–60% for untreated sand).

Lohse found that a weighted table tennis ball (radius 2 cm, mass 133 g), when released from just above the surface of the sand, would sink to about five diameters. Lohse also observed a "straight jet of sand [shooting] violently into the air after about 100 ms". Objects are known to make a splash when they hit sand, but this type of jet had never been described before.

Lohse concluded that

In nature, dry quicksands may evolve from the sedimentation of very fine sand after it has been blown into the air and, if large enough, might be a threat to humans. Indeed, reports that travellers and whole vehicles have been swallowed instantly may even turn out to be credible in the light of our results.

During the planning of the Project Apollo moon missions, dry quicksand on the moon was considered as a potential danger to the missions. The successful landings of the unmanned Surveyor probes a few years earlier and their observations of a solid, rocky surface largely discounted this possibility, however. The large plates at the end of legs of the Apollo Lunar Module were designed to reduce this danger, but the astronauts did not encounter dry quicksand.

In popular culture 
In Indiana Jones and the Kingdom of the Crystal Skull Jones and Marion end up stuck in a dry sandpit.

In Miss Fisher and the Crypt of Tears, Phryne Fisher begins to sink in the Palestinian desert and calls out that she is sinking in quicksand. With no water nearby, it is likely meant to be dry quicksand.

In Lawrence of Arabia, T. E. Lawrence's servant Daud dies when falling into quicksand in the desert. In that scene, there is no evidence of water.

In The Princess Bride, Buttercup falls into dry quicksand, and Westley jumps in to save her.

In Hotel del Luna'''s episode 3, Jang Man Wol falls into dry quicksand.

In 1999's The Mummy'' Rick, Ardeth (Medji), and Captain Winston Havelock crash their plane in the desert and the Captain dies and sinks along with the plane into dry quicksand.

See also
 Fech fech
 Fluidization

References

External links
 Pictures of the quicksand experiment by Lohse et al. 
 Links to video of the quicksand experiment by Lohse et al. 

Sediments
Geological hazards
Granularity of materials
Soil mechanics

ru:Зыбучий песок